The COINTELPRO Papers: Documents from the FBI's Secret Wars Against Dissent in the United States is a book by Ward Churchill and Jim Vander Wall, first published in 1990.  It is a history of the FBI's COINTELPRO efforts to disrupt dissident political organizations within the United States, and reproduces many original FBI memos.

Publication
The COINTELPRO Papers is published by South End Press. The first edition was printed in 1990 with a foreword by John Trudell, a preface by Brian Glick, and a guide to the documents by Chip Berlet and Brian Glick. The book is dedicated to Fred Hampton and Mark Clark. South End Press produced the second edition in 2002, with a new preface, as part of their 'Classics Series'.

External links
 Preface by Brian Glick:  The Face of COINTELPRO 
 More excerpts can be found at:  Google Books 
 Online review (September 27, 2002) of Agents of Repression and The COINTELPRO Papers by Elizabeth Schulte at the Socialist Worker (US):  Chronicling the FBI’s history of dirty tricks 
 Publisher webpage:  The COINTELPRO Papers 

Books by Ward Churchill
1990 non-fiction books
Books about the Federal Bureau of Investigation